Procopia may refer to:
 Prokopia, Byzantine empress consort (811–813)
 Nevrina procopia, a species of moth